Gerald Queen (born 15 January 1945) is a Scottish retired footballer who played as a forward.

Born in Glasgow, he began his senior career with St Mirren, having played at amateur level with Johnstone Burgh. He made 63 appearances in three years with the club, scoring ten goals, before moving to Kilmarnock in 1965. Queen scored 29 goals over the next four years in 95 matches. He moved to England in 1969 to sign for Crystal Palace, where he scored 24 goals in 108 appearances. His last senior club was Leyton Orient, who he joined in 1972. He played in 156 matches for the club over the next five years, scoring 34 goals, before moving to South Africa.

Queen settled in the US managing Cocoa Expos, Florida from 2001 to 2006.

References
General

Specific

1945 births
Living people
Footballers from Glasgow
Scottish footballers
Association football forwards
St Mirren F.C. players
Kilmarnock F.C. players
Crystal Palace F.C. players
Leyton Orient F.C. players
Scottish Football League players
English Football League players
Johnstone Burgh F.C. players
Scottish expatriate footballers
Expatriate soccer players in South Africa
Scottish expatriate sportspeople in South Africa
Scottish expatriate sportspeople in the United States
Scottish Junior Football Association players